Purandaradasa is a 1937 Indian Kannada-language film, directed by B. Chawan and produced by Nanjundappa. The film stars G. Krishnaswamy Iyengar, Tripuramba and J. T. Balakrishnarao. The film has musical score by Bellave Narahari Shastri.

The film was made in Tamil titled Bhaktha Purandaradoss with G. Kalyanarama Bhagavathar and Tripuramba in the lead roles and was released on 14 October 1937.

Cast
G. Krishnaswamy Iyengar as Purandara Dasa
Tripuramba
J. T. Balakrishnarao

Soundtrack
The music was composed by Sundarrajan.

References

External links
 

1930s Kannada-language films
Indian biographical films
1930s biographical films